Haliscera conica is a species of hydrozoan belonging to the family Halicreatidae.

Description 
Umbrella up to 18 mm, with very thick, bluntly conical projection; 64-72 marginal tentacles in adults; 8-9 tentacles and 2 statocysts in each octant; base of tentacles surrounded by broad thickening of marginal cnidocyst tissue; gonads oval, well separated from manubrium in middle portion of 8 broad radial canals.

References

Halicreatidae
Animals described in 1902